Top Thrill Dragster is a hydraulically-launched steel roller coaster located at Cedar Point in Sandusky, Ohio, United States. Its records were surpassed in 2005 by Kingda Ka at Six Flags Great Adventure.

Top Thrill Dragster is themed to Top Fuel drag racing, with the starting launch designed to resemble a dragstrip. The roller coaster is the second Accelerator Coaster model built by Intamin and one of two strata coasters in existence. It has also consistently ranked as one of the world's top steel coasters in the annual Golden Ticket Awards publication from Amusement Today. Following an incident in 2021 in which a guest was severely injured, the park closed the ride indefinitely, later announcing in September 2022 that Top Thrill Dragster would be retired and replaced with a new ride experience. , the roller coaster is scheduled to reopen in 2024.

History

Development 
According to Rob Decker, Vice President of Planning and Design, the park began working on a new project shortly after the debut of Millennium Force in 2000. After the 2001 season ended, a Dodgem ride across from Magnum XL-200's entrance was relocated to Michigan's Adventure to clear the way for the new ride. In April 2002, work began on the concrete foundation. The concrete footings were kept hidden behind a fence when the park opened for the 2002 season. In August, an informal announcement from Cedar Point confirmed the park was building a new ride for the 2003 season. Track pieces identified as Intamin were previously spotted near Mean Streak. Vertical construction by Martin & Vleminckx began in the fall season, months before the formal announcement. By October, the roller coaster had reached  in height, and the highest peak was topped off in December.

At the time, only four such cranes in the United States were tall enough to handle construction of the 420-foot tower section. An official announcement revealing details on the new ride was made the following month on January 9, 2003. The large investment tied it with Millennium Force as being the most expensive in park history. The structure was built by Intamin's subcontractor Stakotra. In March, Cedar Fair registered a trademark for the name "Top Thrill Dragster".

Operation 
Top Thrill Dragster's media day was held on May 1, 2003, and it officially opened to the public three days later. It became the tallest and fastest roller coaster in the world, overtaking the height record from Steel Dragon 2000 at Nagashima Spa Land, built three years earlier, and the speed record from Dodonpa at Fuji-Q Highland, which opened in late 2001. It lost both records to Kingda Ka at Six Flags Great Adventure in May 2005. Intamin designed both Kingda Ka and Top Thrill Dragster, and the two share a similar design and layout that differs primarily by theme and an additional hill featured on Kingda Ka. Shortly after it opened, a faulty valve on the hydraulic system caused a short-term closure. The ride continued to experience a variety of issues dealing with its hydraulic system and launch cable, which frequently led to downtime early on in its tenure.

During the 2017 season's opening weekend, Cedar Point temporarily renamed the ride "Top Thrill Cubster", referencing a lost wager with Six Flags Great America over the World Series. In 2020 during the COVID-19 pandemic, timed boarding passes called "Access Passes" were used temporarily to comply with social distancing guidelines.

Closure 
In August 2021, Top Thrill Dragster experienced a "serious accident" in which a guest waiting in line was seriously injured after a small metal piece was dislodged from a train. An investigation by the Ohio Department of Agriculture (ODA) determined that half of the bolts securing the plate dislodged. Although ODA finished its investigation in February 2022, exonerating Cedar Point from any wrongdoing, park officials announced that Top Thrill Dragster would remain closed for the 2022 season. 

On September 6, 2022, Cedar Point officials released an update on social media stating, "Top Thrill Dragster, as you know it, is being retired." This came after an extended closure that spanned more than one season. Officials did not provide further details other than stating they were working on a "new and reimagined ride experience". When it closed, Top Thrill Dragster had accommodated 18 million riders over 19 seasons. Prior to the end of Cedar Point's operating season, parts of the roller coaster's track near the station were dismantled. On January 9, 2023, Cedar Point announced on social media that the ride would reopen in 2024 under the tagline "A New Formula For Thrills", although the park did not release any other information at that time.

Ride experience

Layout 

After leaving the station, the train entered the launch area. To the left of the launch area was a "Christmas tree" light, similar to those employed at the starting line of a drag strip. A brief message was played to the riders before the launch: "Keep arms down, head back, and hold on." Once the train was prepared to launch, a motor revving sound effect was played and its magnetic braking fins were lowered from the launch track. Shortly after reaching its maximum velocity, the catch car disengaged, and the train began its ascent up a 90-degree incline, twisting 90 degrees clockwise before climbing over the  top hat. Upon descending, the track twisted 270 degrees before leveling out, allowing the train to be stopped by the magnetic brakes.

Station, theme, and trains 
The roller coaster was themed to Top Fuel drag racing, a category of motor racing that involved the world's fastest accelerating cars. An actual Top Fuel dragster weighs approximately one ton, while each train on the coaster weighed 15 tons. Originally, the design called for five cars on each train, but when the ride first opened, there were only four. A fifth car was added to each by midseason. Each dragster-themed train was also decorated with a spoiler, a set of tires, and an engine at the rear of each train, but these were removed after the fifth car was added to allow an extra row of seats to take their place.

Rollbacks 
Occasionally, a train was launched without sufficient speed to reach the top of the tower and rolled back onto the launch track, hence the term "rollback". This typically happened in cool, wet, or breezy weather, or when the wind was working against it. The launch track was equipped with retractable magnetic braking fins, which were raised after each launch to slow the train down in case it did not reach the top of the tower.

On very rare occasions, a combination of the weight distribution of the train, the force of the launch, and the wind could stall a train on top of the tower. When this happened, a mechanic took the elevator to the top and pushed the train down the hill.

Characteristics 

When Top Thrill Dragster debuted, it set four new records:

 World's tallest complete circuit roller coaster
 World's tallest roller coaster
 World's tallest roller coaster drop
 World's fastest roller coaster

It was the fourth roller coaster to exceed , preceded by Tower of Terror II at Dreamworld, Superman: Escape from Krypton at Six Flags Magic Mountain and Dodonpa at Fuji-Q Highland.

In the last operational year of the Top Thrill Dragster in 2021, the roller coaster had the second tallest height, the third fastest speed, and the second-highest drop among steel roller coasters in the world. Top Thrill Dragster was the second hydraulically-launched roller coaster from Intamin following Xcelerator at Knott's Berry Farm, and along with Kingda Ka, it is one of two strata coasters ever built. Its marketing tagline was "Race for the Sky".

Incidents and accidents 

On July 14, 2004, four people were struck by flying debris while riding the coaster. Reports indicated that a metal cable frayed during launch, shearing off shards of metal that struck the riders. The injuries were mainly arm abrasions, with one passenger experiencing cuts to the face. They were treated at the park's first aid station, and two later sought further medical attention.

On August 7, 2016, two people were treated for minor injuries when the launch cable detached from the ride. The ride was closed for the following day while the park and Ohio state officials investigated the incident.

In September 2017, a report with photos surfaced that the braking system on the launch side of the track may have been damaged, causing the ride to close indefinitely. Cedar Point did not acknowledge the incident and stated the closure was for maintenance reasons.

On August 15, 2021, in what was described as a "serious accident", a guest waiting in line was struck by a small metal piece that dislodged from a train as it was nearing the end of its run. The guest was taken to a nearby hospital and was found to have suffered serious injuries. Cedar Point announced that the coaster would be closed for the remainder of the season. The piece was later determined to be a flag plate – an L-shaped bracket that signals the train's location to sensors positioned along the track. An ODA investigation later determined that half of the bolts securing the plate dislodged. The ODA required that Top Thrill Dragster be closed during the investigation and subsequent re-inspections. ODA found there was "insufficient evidence to find the action or inactions of Cedar Point violated any of the laws" and concluded its investigation in February 2022. However, Cedar Point was required to perform a list of repairs, including repairing damaged track sections and replacing "different or improper grade" bolts before ODA could certify the attraction to reopen. Despite this, the ride never reopened, and its retirement was announced on September 6, 2022.

Awards

Records

References

External links 

 

Cedar Point
Roller coasters in Ohio
Roller coasters introduced in 2003
Roller coasters operated by Cedar Fair
Roller coasters that closed in 2021